= Jean Vandivinit =

Luxembourgish footballer

Personal information
- Date of birth: 20 January 1934 (age 92)

International career
Years	Team	Apps	(Gls)
1961–1963	Luxembourg	9	(1)

Jean Vandivinit (born 20 January 1934) is a Luxembourgish footballer. He played in nine matches for the Luxembourg national football team from 1961 to 1963.
